Liang Sanmei is a Chinese rower.

Career 
Liang has won medals in the lightweight women's four at World Rowing Championships in 1988 (gold), 1989 (gold), 1990 (bronze), and 1991 (gold).

References

Chinese female rowers
Year of birth missing (living people)
World Rowing Championships medalists for China
Asian Games medalists in rowing
Rowers at the 1990 Asian Games
Asian Games gold medalists for China
Medalists at the 1990 Asian Games
Living people